Dysschema eurocilia is a moth of the family Erebidae first described by Pieter Cramer in 1777. It is a common species throughout tropical America, where it has been recorded from the Antilles, Central America (including Costa Rica, Panama and Guatemala) and South America (including Paraguay, Brazil, Suriname, Peru, Colombia, Venezuela and Ecuador).

It is a highly variable species, especially the females.

The larvae feed on the leaves of Vernonia species and Lepidaploa canescens.

References

Moths described in 1777
Dysschema